Miguel Brieva (born Seville, 1974) is a Spanish cartoonist.

Brieva is well known for cartoons in the style of advertisements of the 1950s-1960s in El País, Rolling Stone, and El Jueves.

Works
 Enciclopedia Clismón -(Clismón's encyclopedia) (Mondadori publishers, 2007).
 Dinero (Money) (Mondadori publishers, 2008).
 El Otro Mundo (The Other World) (Mondadori publishers, 2009).
 Memorias de la Tierra (Earth's Memories) (Mondadori publishers, 2012).
 Obras incompletas de Marcz Doplacie (Incomplete works of Marcz Doplacie) (Belleza Infinita, 2012).
 Lo que (me) está pasando (What is Happening (to me)) (Reservoir Books, 2015).

References

1974 births
Spanish cartoonists
Living people